Moldovan, also known historically as Moldavian, is one of the two local names for the Romanian language in Moldova. Moldovan was declared the official language in Article 13 of the constitution adopted in 1994, while the 1991 Declaration of Independence of Moldova used the name Romanian. In 2003, the Moldovan parliament adopted a law defining Moldovan and Romanian as glottonyms for the same language. In 2013, the Constitutional Court of Moldova interpreted that Article 13 of the constitution is superseded by the Declaration of Independence, thus giving official status to the name Romanian. The breakaway region of Transnistria continues to recognize Moldovan as one of its official languages, alongside Russian and Ukrainian. Ukraine also continues to make a distinction between Moldovan and Romanian, with one village declaring its language to be Romanian and another declaring it to be Moldovan, though Ukrainian officials have announced an intention to remove the legal status of Moldovan. On March 16th, 2023, The Moldovan Parliment approved a law on refering to the national language as Romanian in all legislative texts and the constitution. 

The language of the Moldovans had historically been identified by both terms, but during the time of the Soviet Union Moldovan, or, as it was called at the time, Moldavian, was the only term officially recognized. Soviet policy emphasized distinctions between Moldavians and Romanians based on their allegedly different histories. Its resolution declared Moldavian a distinct Romance language from Romanian.

While a majority of Moldovans with higher education, as well as a majority of inhabitants of the capital city of Chișinău, call their language Romanian, most rural residents indicated Moldovan as their native language in the 2004 census. In schools in Moldova, the term "Romanian language" has been used since independence.

The variety of Romanian spoken in Moldova is the Moldavian subdialect, which is spread approximately within the territory of the former Principality of Moldavia (now split between Moldova, Romania, and Ukraine). Moldavian is considered one of the five major spoken varieties of Romanian. However, all five are written identically, and Moldova and Romania share the same literary language.

The standard alphabet used in Moldova is equivalent to the Romanian alphabet, which uses the Latin script. Until 1918, varieties of the Romanian Cyrillic alphabet were used. The Moldovan Cyrillic alphabet (derived from the Russian alphabet and standardised in the Soviet Union) was used in 1924–1932 and 1938–1989 and remains in use in Transnistria.

History and politics 

The history of the Moldovan language refers to the historical evolution of the glottonym Moldavian/Moldovan in Moldova and beyond. It is closely tied to the region's political status, as during long periods of rule by Russia and the Soviet Union, officials emphasized the language's name as part of separating the Moldovans from those people who began to identify as Romanian in a different nation-building process. Cyrillic script was in use. From a linguistic perspective, Moldovan is an alternative name for the varieties of the Romanian language spoken in the Republic of Moldova (see History of the Romanian language).

Before 1918, during the period between the wars, and after the union of Bessarabia with Romania, scholars did not have consensus that Moldovans and the Romanians formed a single ethnic group. The Moldovan peasants had grown up in a different political entity and missed the years of creating a pan-Romanian national political consciousness. They identified as Moldovans speaking the language "Moldovan". This caused reactions from pan-Romanian nationalists. The concept of the distinction of Moldovan from Romanian was explicitly stated only in the early 20th century. It accompanied the raising of national awareness among Moldovans, with the Soviets emphasizing distinctions between Moldavians and Romanians. Moldavian has also been recorded by the 1960s' Romanian Linguistic Atlas as the answer to the question "What [language] do you speak?" in parts of Western Moldavia (Galați and Iași counties).

Major developments since the fall of the Soviet Union include resuming use of a Latin script rather than Cyrillic letters in 1989, and several changes in the statutory name of the official language used in Moldova. At one point of particular confusion about identity in the 1990s, all references to geography in the name of the language were dropped, and it was officially known simply as  — 'the state language'.

Moldovan was assigned the code mo in ISO 639-1 and code mol in ISO 639-2 and ISO 639-3. Since November 2008, these have been deprecated, leaving ro and ron (639-2/T) and rum (639-2/B), the language identifiers  to be used for the variant of the Romanian language also known as Moldavian and Moldovan in English, the ISO 639-2 Registration Authority said in explaining the decision.

In 1989, the contemporary Romanian version of the Latin alphabet was adopted as the official script of the Moldavian SSR.

Since independence 

The Declaration of Independence of Moldova (27 August 1991) named the official language as "Romanian". The 1994 constitution, passed under a Communist government, declared "Moldovan" as the state language.

When in 1993 the Romanian Academy changed the official orthography of the Romanian language, the Institute of Linguistics at the Academy of Sciences of Moldova did not initially make these changes, which however have since been adopted.

In 1996, the Moldovan president Mircea Snegur attempted to change the official name of the language back to Romanian; the Moldovan Parliament, Communist-dominated, dismissed the proposal as promoting "Romanian expansionism".

In 2003, a Moldovan–Romanian dictionary ( (2003)) by Vasile Stati was published aiming to prove that there existed two distinct languages. Reacting to this, linguists of the Romanian Academy in Romania declared that all the Moldovan words are also Romanian words, although some of its contents are disputed as being Russian loanwords. In Moldova, the head of the Academy of Sciences' Institute of Linguistics, described the dictionary as "an absurdity, serving political purposes". Stati, however, accused both of promoting "Romanian colonialism". At that point, a group of Romanian linguists adopted a resolution stating that promotion of the notion of a distinct Moldovan language is an anti-scientific campaign.

In 2003, the Parliament of the Republic of Moldova adopted a law defining Moldovan and Romanian as designations for the same language (glottonyms). 

In the 2004 census, 16.5% (558,508) of the 3,383,332 people living in Moldova declared Romanian as their native language, whereas 60% declared Moldovan. Most of the latter responses were from rural populations. While the majority of the population in the capital city of Chișinău gave their language as "Romanian", in the countryside more than six-sevenths of the Romanian/Moldovan speakers indicated "Moldovan" as their native language, reflecting historic conservatism.

In schools in Moldova, the term Romanian language has been used since independence.

In December 2007, Moldovan president Vladimir Voronin asked for the term to be changed to Moldovan language, but due to public pressure against that choice, the term was not changed.

In December 2013, the Constitutional Court of Moldova ruled that the Declaration of Independence takes precedence over the Constitution and that the state language should be called Romanian.

As of March 2017, the presidential website under Igor Dodon has seen the Romanian language option changed to Moldovan, which is described to be "in accordance with the constitution" by said president. The change was reverted on 24 December 2020, the day Maia Sandu assumed office.

In June 2021, during a meeting between the Ministry of Foreign Affairs of Romania Bogdan Aurescu and the Ministry of Foreign Affairs of Ukraine Dmytro Kuleba, the former asked Ukraine to recognize the nonexistence of the Moldovan language to improve the situation of the Romanians in Ukraine. Kuleba responded to this saying that they were trying to do the paperwork for this as soon as possible. On 30 November 2022, during another meeting between Aurescu and Kuleba, Aurescu reiterated this request.

On 2 March 2023, the Moldovan parliament voted to replace the phrases "Moldovan language", "state language" and "official language" in Moldovan legislation with the phrase "Romanian language". The change was presented not as a constitutional change, but only a technical one, as it would implement the 2013 decision of the Constitutional Court of Moldova. This change was supported by the ruling Party of Action and Solidarity and was strongly opposed by the Bloc of Communists and Socialists. The Academy of Sciences of Moldova also supported this decision. The bill was approved on its second and final reading on 16 March.

Controversy 

The matter of whether or not Moldovan is a separate language continues to be contested politically within and beyond the Republic of Moldova. The 1989 Language Law of the Moldavian SSR, which is still in effect in Moldova, according to the Constitution, asserts a "linguistic Moldo-Romanian identity". Article 13 of the Moldovan Constitution names it "the national language of the country" (the original uses the phrase , which literally means 'the language of the state').

In the breakaway region of Transnistria, Moldovan is declared an official language, together with Ukrainian and Russian.

Standard Moldovan is widely considered to be identical to standard Romanian. Writing about "essential differences", Vasile Stati, supporter of Moldovenism, is obliged to concentrate almost exclusively on lexical rather than grammatical differences. Whatever language distinctions may once have existed, these have been decreasing rather than increasing. King wrote in 2000 that "in the main, Moldovan in its standard form was more Romanian by the 1980s than at any point in its history".

In 2002, the Moldovan Minister of Justice Ion Morei said that Romanian and Moldovan were the same language and that the Constitution of Moldova should be amended to reflect this—not by substituting Romanian for the word Moldovan, but by adding that "Romanian and Moldovan are the same language". The education minister  said: "I have stated more than once that the notion of a Moldovan language and a Romanian language reflects the same linguistic phenomenon in essence." The President of Moldova Vladimir Voronin acknowledged that the two languages are identical, but said that Moldovans should have the right to call their language "Moldovan".

In the 2004 census, of the 3.38 million people living in Moldova, 60% identified Moldovan as their native language; 16.5% chose Romanian. While 37% of all urban Romanian/Moldovan speakers identified Romanian as their native language, in the countryside 86% of the Romanian/Moldovan speakers indicated Moldovan, a historic holdover. Independent studies found a Moldovan linguistic identity asserted in particular by the rural population and post-Soviet political class. In a survey conducted in four villages near the border with Romania, when asked about their native language the interviewees identified the following: Moldovan 53%, Romanian 44%, Russian 3%.

In November 2007, when reporting on EU Council deliberations regarding an agreement between the European Community and Moldova, the Romanian reporter Jean Marin Marinescu included a recommendation to avoid formal references to the "Moldovan language". The Romanian press speculated that the EU banned the usage of the phrase "Moldovan language". However, the European Commissioner for External Relations and European Neighbourhood Policy, Benita Ferrero-Waldner, denied these allegations. She said that the Moldovan language is referred to in the 1998 Cooperation Agreement between the EU and Moldova, and hence it is considered a part of the acquis, binding on all member states.

Orthography 

The language was generally written in a Romanian Cyrillic alphabet (based on the Old Church Slavonic alphabet) before the 19th century. Both Cyrillic and, rarely, Latin, were used until after World War I; after Bessarabia was included in Romania in 1918, the Cyrillic alphabet was officially forbidden in the region. In the interwar period, Soviet authorities in the Moldavian Autonomous Soviet Socialist Republic alternately used Latin or Cyrillic for writing the language, mirroring the political goals of the moment. Between 1940 and 1989, i.e., during Soviet rule, the new Moldovan Cyrillic alphabet replaced Latin as the official alphabet in Moldova (then Moldavian SSR). In 1989, the Latin script was once again adopted in Moldova by Law 3462 of 31 August 1989, which provided rules for transliterating Cyrillic to Latin, along with the orthographic rules used in Romania at the time. Transnistria, however, uses the Cyrillic alphabet.

Though not immediately adopting these, the Academy of Sciences of Moldova acknowledged both the Romanian Academy's decision of 1993 and the orthographic reform of 2005. In 2000, the Moldovan Academy recommended adopting the spelling rules used in Romania, and in 2010 launched a schedule for the transition to the new rules that was completed in 2011 (regarding its publications). However, these changes were not implemented by Moldova's Ministry of Education, so the old orthographic conventions were maintained in the education sector such as in school textbooks.

On 17 October 2016, Minister of Education Corina Fusu signed Order No. 872 on the application of the revised spelling rules as adopted by the Moldovan Academy of Sciences, coming into force on the day of signing. Since then the spelling used by institutions subordinated to the Ministry of Education is in line with the spelling norms used in Romania since 1993. This order, however, has no application to other government institutions, nor has Law 3462 been amended to reflect these changes; thus, those institutions continue to use the old spelling.

See also 

 Eastern Romance substratum
 Legacy of the Roman Empire
 Moldova–Romania relations
 Thraco-Roman
 The Balkan language area

Notes

References

Further reading 

  – About the identity of the contemporary Moldovans in the context of debates about their language.

External links 

 Chase Faucheux, "Language classification and manipulation in Romania and Moldova", thesis, 2006, Louisiana State University 
 Eleonora Rusnac, "Translation of Russian loans and irregularities of the spoken language in the Republic of Moldova", Association of Professional Translators of Moldova
 "Moldova" , Ethnologue report 
 Academy of Sciences of Moldova 
  

 
Eastern Romance languages
Romanian language
Languages of Moldova
Languages of Ukraine